Ivan Nikitovich Kozhedub (Russian: Иван Hикитович Кожедуб; Ukrainian: Іван Микитович Кожедуб; 8 June 1920 – 8 August 1991) was a Soviet World War II fighter ace. Universally credited with over 60 solo victories, he is considered to be the highest scoring Soviet and Allied fighter pilot of World War II. He is one of the few pilots to have shot down a Messerschmitt Me 262 jet, and the first Soviet pilot to have done so. He was made a Hero of the Soviet Union on three occasions (4 February  1944, 19 August 1944, and 18 August 1945). After World War II, he remained in the military and went on to command the 324th Fighter Aviation Division during Soviet operations in the Korean War.

Early life 
Kozhedub was born on 8 June 1920 to a Ukrainian family in the village of Obrazhiivka, in Chernigov Governorate, located within what is now Shostka Raion of Ukraine's Sumy Oblast. After graduating from his seventh grade of school in his hometown in 1934 he went on to complete two more years of school in Shostka. There he initially worked as a librarian until completing his ninth grade of school in 1936, and from that year to 1940 he attended the Shostka Chemical Technology College. In addition to his studies, he attended training at the local aeroclub, which he graduated from in 1939. He subsequently joined the Red Army in February 1940, and in January 1941 he graduated from training at the Chuhuiv Military Aviation School of Pilots, where he initially learned to fly the UT-2, UTI-4, and I-16. Remaining at the school as a flight instructor, he continued to train pilots after the school was forced to evacuate to Shymkent in fall 1941 due to the German invasion of the Soviet Union until he was sent to Moscow in November 1942. There, he was posted to the 240th Fighter Aviation Regiment, but he did not arrive on the warfront until the 302nd Fighter Aviation Division was deployed to the Voronezh Front in March 1943.

World War II 
Despite having started off in the regiment as a regular pilot, he quickly mastered the new La-5 and gained a promotion to flight commander by the time he opened his tally on 6 July 1943 with the shootdown of a Ju 87 dive bomber. Having made friends with Kirill Yevstigneev, an accomplished flying ace, even though they did not fly often together, Kozhedub picked up on many of his tactics and they shared their experiences about different techniques in addition to developing a competitive spirit. In addition, Vasily Mukhin, who often flew with Kozhedub as wingman, also went on to become a flying ace.

Over the next few months Kozhedub steadily gained more aerial victories in addition to a promotion to squadron commander, but in October he rapidly added to his tally, totaling 14 shootdowns in the first half of the month; on 10 October 1943 he was nominated for the title Hero of the Soviet Union for flying 146 sorties, engaging in 27 aerial battles, and totaling 20 aerial victories; he was awarded the title for the first time on 4 February 1944.

In July 1944 the 240th Fighter Regiment was honored with the guards designation and renamed as the 178th Fighter Aviation Regiment, and Kozhedub was nominated for a second gold star for totaling 46 aerial victories over the course of 256 sorties. However, he did not stay with his regiment for much longer, since he was reassigned to be the deputy commander of the 176th Guards Fighter Aviation Regiment, a special "free hunting" regiment equipped with the new Lavochkin La-7 fighter, per the initiative of Chief Marshal of Aviation Aleksandr Novikov. There, he was rarely assigned specific missions of escorting other aircraft or providing air support for troops, enabling him and his subordinates to tally more aerial victories. In mid-February 1945, during a mission with his wingman Dmitry Titarenko, Kozhedub shot down a Me 262 jet, making him the first Soviet pilot to do so. During the encounter, Kozhedub and Titarenko went on a free hunting flight in an area south of Frankfurt, where they encountered the Me 262; originally flying at a low speed, Kozhedub quickly went up to full speed, and then shot it down after it banked left and slowed down, having been spooked by the tracer rounds fired by Titarenko.

By the end of the war, Kozhedub totaled 330 sorties, during which he engaged in 120 dogfights and shot down 64 enemy aircraft. Having gained all his aerial victories on the La-5F, La-5FN, and La-7, he expressed his strong preference for Lavochkin fighters, and met with Semyon Lavochkin to comment on various aspects of the fighters design. Having been nominated for a third gold star in May 1945, he became a thrice Hero of the Soviet Union on 18 August 1945, and remained deputy commander of the 176th Guards Fighter Aviation Regiment based in Schönwalde until September that year.

Preferring short, intense attacks to stun and bring down enemy aircraft, one of his favorite techniques he developed and used in the war was a method of darting at a target from below and subsequently opening fire only when extremely close; while Kozhedub was very successful in using this tactic against the Ju 87 dive bomber, allowing him to total 18 shootdowns of the type (putting him at a tie with Arseny Vorozheykin for the most shootdowns of the type). However, because the maneuver was so risky, it was not promoted or taught to young pilots. He was never shot down in the war, although he did experience several close calls; nevertheless, he always managed to land his airplane, despite damage sustained.

Post war era
Upon returning to the USSR Kozhedub attended the Air Force Academy based in Monino, which he graduated from in May 1949 and was originally supposed to be posted as deputy commander of the 31st Fighter Aviation Division based in Baku, but due to his high status as a top flying ace he was instead reassigned to the 324th Fighter Aviation Division per orders from above. There, he initially served as assistant commander for flight training, but was soon promoted to command the division in November 1950. Soon thereafter in the unit was sent to China, where initially they trained Chinese and North Korean pilots. Kozhedub, despite being one of the first pilots to master the MiG-15 fighter jet back in 1949, was strictly forbidden from participating in combat sorties by order of many of his commanding officers. In addition, his division consisted of only two regiments (the 176th Guards and 196th Fighter Aviation Regiments) instead of the usual three. Nevertheless, the pilots of his division claimed 216 aerial victories in Korea from April 1951 to February 1952, while sustaining only 27 MiG-15 losses and nine pilots killed.

Upon its return to the Soviet Union in February 1952, the 324th Fighter Division was stationed in Kaluga as an air defense unit. The next year he was promoted to the rank of major-general, and in February 1955 he went on to attend the High Command Academy, which he graduated from in 1956. He then served as deputy head of the air force combat training and frontline aviation training directorates. Having become the 1st deputy commander of the 76th Air Army in April 1958, he visited Cuba alongside the unit's commander Viktor Davidkov from 1962 to 1963. From 1974 to February 1971 he served as 1st deputy commander of the air force of the Moscow Military District, although he stopped flying in 1969. During his career as a pilot he totaled 1937 flight hours, piloting the Yak-3, Yak-11, Yak-17, Yak-28, MiG-15, MiG-17, MiG-21, Li-2, and Il-14 aircraft as well as Mi-4 and Mi-8 helicopters. From 1971 to 1978 he served as the deputy chief of combat training of the air force, and subsequently he became a military advisor in Ministry of Defense; in 1985 he was promoted to the rank of Marshal of Aviation. In addition to his military duties he served as a deputy of the Supreme Soviet of the USSR from 1946 to 1962 and chairman of the Federation of Aviation Sports from 1967 to 1987. He resided in Moscow for the rest of his life, where he died of a heart attack on 8 August 1991 and was buried in the Novodevichy cemetery.

List of aerial victories

According to Soviet aces 1941—1945. The victories of Stalin's Falcons by Mikhail Bykov.

 Until August 1944 Kozhedub was flying on Lavochkin La-5, after that Lavochkin La-7.

Alleged shootdown of two USAAF P-51 fighters
In his autobiography, Kozhedub claimed to have downed two USAAF P-51 Mustang due to a friendly fire incident on 17 April 1945. By his account, he encountered a group of American B-17 Flying Fortresses under attack by Luftwaffe aircraft. His aircraft was apparently mistaken by American escort fighters for the enemy and attacked. Kozhedub, having no other option, defended himself by shooting down two of the P-51s.  The story is highly suspect. Film footage exists that had been touted as Kozhedub's actual gun camera film from the event; however, the footage was shot using Zeiss equipment, which was used primarily by the Luftwaffe.

Awards and honors

Soviet Union
Thrice Hero of the Soviet Union (4 February  1944, 19 August 1944 and 18 August 1945)
Two Order of Lenin (4 February  1944 and 21 February 1978)
Seven Order of the Red Banner (22 July 1943, 30 September 1943, 29 March 1945, 29 June 1945, 2 June 1951, 22 February 1958, and 26 June 1970)
Order of Alexander Nevsky (31 July 1945)
Order of the Patriotic War 1st class (11 March 1985)
Two Order of the Red Star (4 June 1955 and 20 October 1955)
Order "For Service to the Homeland in the Armed Forces of the USSR", 2nd degree (22 February 1990) 
Order "For Service to the Homeland in the Armed Forces of the USSR", 3rd degree (30 April 1975) 
Medal "For Battle Merit"
Medal "For the Liberation of Warsaw" (1945)
Medal "For the Capture of Berlin" (1945)
Medal "For the Victory over Germany in the Great Patriotic War 1941–1945" (1945)
Jubilee Medal "Twenty Years of Victory in the Great Patriotic War 1941–1945" (1965)
Jubilee Medal "Thirty Years of Victory in the Great Patriotic War 1941–1945" (1975)
Jubilee Medal "Forty Years of Victory in the Great Patriotic War 1941–1945" (1985)
Jubilee Medal "In Commemoration of the 100th Anniversary of the Birth of Vladimir Ilyich Lenin" (1969)
Medal "Veteran of the Armed Forces of the USSR" (1976)
Medal "For Strengthening of Brotherhood in Arms" 
Medal "For Impeccable Service", 1st class
Jubilee Medal "30 Years of the Soviet Army and Navy" (1948)
Jubilee Medal "40 Years of the Armed Forces of the USSR" (1957)
Jubilee Medal "50 Years of the Armed Forces of the USSR" (1967)
Jubilee Medal "60 Years of the Armed Forces of the USSR" (1978)
Jubilee Medal "70 Years of the Armed Forces of the USSR" (1988)
Medal "In Commemoration of the 800th Anniversary of Moscow" (1947)
Medal "In Commemoration of the 1500th Anniversary of Kyiv" (1982)

Foreign
Medal of Sino-Soviet Friendship (China)
Patriotic Order of Merit, Bronze, 3rd class (East Germany)
Order of the Red Banner (Mongolia)
Medal "50 Years of the Mongolian People's Army" (Mongolia)
Order of the National Flag, 3rd class (North Korea)
Order of Freedom and Independence, 1st class (North Korea)
Knight's Cross of the Order of Polonia Restituta (Poland)

Legacy
A military university in Kharkiv is named in his honor, the Kozhedub University of the Air Force.

Footnotes

References

Bibliography

 

 

1920 births
1991 deaths
People from Sumy Oblast
Communist Party of the Soviet Union members
Members of the Supreme Soviet of the Soviet Union
Members of the Congress of People's Deputies of the Soviet Union
Soviet Air Force marshals
Ukrainian aviators
Soviet military personnel of World War II
Soviet World War II flying aces
Ukrainian people of World War II
Soviet military personnel of the Korean War
Heroes of the Soviet Union
Recipients of the Order of Lenin
Recipients of the Order of the Red Banner
Recipients of the Order of Alexander Nevsky
Recipients of the Order of the Red Star
Recipients of the Order "For Service to the Homeland in the Armed Forces of the USSR", 2nd class
Recipients of the Order "For Service to the Homeland in the Armed Forces of the USSR", 3rd class
Knights of the Order of Polonia Restituta
Recipients of the Patriotic Order of Merit
Burials at Novodevichy Cemetery